Raymond Gunemba (born 4 June 1986) is a Papua New Guinean professional footballer who plays as a  forward for Lae City Dwellers and the Papua New Guinea national football team.

International goals
As of match played 20 July 2019. Papua New Guinea score listed first, score column indicates score after each Gunemba goal.

Honours

Club

PRK Hekari United
Papua New Guinea National Soccer League(3): 2011–12, 2013, 2014

Lae City Dwellers FC
Papua New Guinea National Soccer League: 2015

Country

Papua New Guinea
OFC Nations Cup Runners-up: 2016

Individual
OFC Nations Cup Golden Boot: 2016
IFFHS OFC Men's Team of the Decade 2011–2020

References

1986 births
Living people
Papua New Guinean footballers
People from Morobe Province
Association football forwards
Hekari United players
Hamilton Wanderers players
New Zealand Football Championship players
Expatriate association footballers in New Zealand
Papua New Guinean expatriate sportspeople in New Zealand
2012 OFC Nations Cup players
2016 OFC Nations Cup players
Papua New Guinea international footballers